Dominique David (born 27 February 1963) is a French entrepreneur and politician of La République En Marche! (LREM) who was elected to the French National Assembly in the 2017 elections, representing the department of Gironde.

Political career
In parliament, David serves on the Defense Committee.

Political positions
In July 2019, David voted in favor of the French ratification of the European Union’s Comprehensive Economic and Trade Agreement (CETA) with Canada.

References

1963 births
Living people
Deputies of the 15th National Assembly of the French Fifth Republic
Women members of the National Assembly (France)
La République En Marche! politicians
Politicians from Montpellier
Politicians from Nouvelle-Aquitaine
21st-century French women